Spillover infection, also known as pathogen spillover and spillover event, occurs when a reservoir population with a high pathogen prevalence comes into contact with a novel host population. The pathogen is transmitted from the reservoir population and may or may not be transmitted within the host population. Due to climate change and land use expansion, the risk of viral spillover is predicted to significantly increase.

Spillover zoonoses 

Spillover is a common event; in fact, more than two-thirds of human viruses are zoonotic.  Most spillover events result in self-limited cases with no further human to human transmission, as occurs, for example, with rabies, anthrax, histoplasmosis or hidatidosis. Other zoonotic pathogens are able to be transmitted by humans to produce secondary cases and even to establish limited chains of transmission. Some examples are the Ebola and Marburg filoviruses, the MERS and SARS coronaviruses and some avian flu viruses. Finally, some spillover events can result in the final adaptation of the microbe to humans, who can become a new stable reservoir, as occurred with the HIV virus resulting in the AIDS epidemic and with SARS-CoV-2 resulting in the COVID-19 pandemic.

If the history of mutual adaptation is long enough, permanent host-microbe associations can be established resulting in co-evolution, and even permanent integration of the microbe genome with the human genome, as it is the case of endogenous viruses.  The closer the two target host species are in phylogenetic terms, the easier it is for microbes to overcome the biological barrier to produce successful spillovers.  For this reason, other mammals are the main source of zoonotic agents for humans. For example, in the case of the Ebola virus, fruit bats, are the hypothesized zoonotic agent.

During the late 20th century zoonotic spillover increased as the environmental impact of agriculture promoted increased land use and deforestation, changing wildlife habitat.  As species shift their geographic range in response to  climate change, the risk of zoonotic spillover is predicted to substantially increase, particularly in tropical regions that are experiencing rapid warming. As forested areas of land are cleared for human use, there is increased proximity and interaction between wild animals and humans thereby increasing the potential for exposure.

Intraspecies spillover 

Commercially bred bumblebees used to pollinate greenhouses can be reservoirs for several pollinator parasites including the protozoans Crithidia bombi, and Apicystis bombi, the microsporidians Nosema bombi and Nosema ceranae, plus viruses such as Deformed wing virus and the tracheal mites Locustacarus buchneri.  Commercial bees that escape the glasshouse environment may then infect wild bee populations. Infection may be via direct interactions between managed and wild bees or via shared flower use and contamination. One study found that half of all wild bees found near greenhouses were infected with C. bombi. Rates and incidence of infection decline dramatically the further away from the greenhouses the wild bees are located. Instances of spillover between bumblebees are well documented across the world but particularly in Japan, North America and the United Kingdom.

See also 

 Cross-species transmission
 Reverse zoonosis
 Epidemic
 Infection
 Outbreak
 List of Legionellosis outbreaks
 1993 Four Corners hantavirus outbreak
 Severe acute respiratory syndrome coronavirus 2

References

External links 
 Infection Information Resource
 European Center for Disease Prevention and Control
 U.S. Centers for Disease Control and Prevention,
 Infectious Disease Society of America (IDSA)

Epidemiology
Viruses
Zoonoses